Montbrison may refer to:

 Arrondissement of Montbrison, Loire département, France
 Canton of Montbrison, Loire département, France
 Montbrison, Loire, a commune in the Arrondissement
 Montbrison-sur-Lez, a commune in the Drôme département, France